Moses Kotane Local Municipality is a local municipality in Bojanala Platinum District Municipality, North West Province, South Africa. It is named in memory of Moses Kotane. The seat of local municipality is Mogwase.

Main places
The 2001 census divided the municipality into the following main places:

Politics 

The municipal council consists of sixty-nine members elected by mixed-member proportional representation. Thirty-five councillors are elected by first-past-the-post voting in thirty-five wards, while the remaining thirty-four are chosen from party lists so that the total number of party representatives is proportional to the number of votes received. In the 2021 South African municipal elections the African National Congress (ANC) won a majority of forty-six seats on the council.

The following table shows the results of the election.

References

External links 
 Official site

 
Local municipalities of the Bojanala Platinum District Municipality